Five cable-laying ships have been named CS Monarch, or, after the nationalisation of British telegraph companies, HMTS Monarch:

 , a paddle steamer built in 1830, used as a cable ship by Electric Telegraph Company from 1853 onwards.
 , built in 1883 for the Post Office. Sunk 1915 off Folkestone in World War I.
 , built in 1916 as a replacement for  but named Monarch after the 1915 sinking.  Badly damaged by friendly fire from an American ship during the Normandy landings (Monarch was tasked with providing a telephone connection to France).  Sunk by U-boat off Folkestone 16 April 1945 after repairing a cable to the Netherlands.
 , launched in 1945 and completed in 1946 she was renamed CS Sentinel in 1970 and broken up in 1977.
 , launched in 1973 and broken up in 2003.

See also
 Monarch (disambiguation)#Ships, for other ships named Monarch

References 

Ship names